Khiloksky (masculine), Khilokskaya (feminine), or Khilokskoye (neuter) may refer to:
Khiloksky District, a district of Zabaykalsky Krai, Russia
Khilokskoye Urban Settlement, a municipal formation which the town of Khilok and two rural localities in Khiloksky District of Zabaykalsky Krai, Russia are incorporated as